The Anggitay is a creature with the upper body of a female human and the lower body and legs of a horse from waist down. They were the Philippine counterpart to the centauride, the female centaurs. They are also believed to be the female counterpart of the Tikbalang.

They are sometimes depicted as having a single horn in the middle of their forehead, just like a unicorn. They were usually said to be attracted to precious gemstones, and jewelry. Their homeland is believed to be in Santo Tomas, Batangas.

References

Horses in mythology
Philippine legendary creatures
Visayan mythology
Female legendary creatures